Ella Wishes You a Swinging Christmas is a 1960 album by the American jazz singer Ella Fitzgerald, recorded in the summer of 1960, with a studio orchestra arranged and conducted by Frank DeVol. The tracks are all secular Christmas seasonal songs, in contrast to her second Christmas album released in 1967.

It is Fitzgerald's only Verve complete album of Christmas tunes. Verve had issued a 7" 45rpm single in 1959, featuring "The Christmas Song" with "The Secret of Christmas" on the B-side; both were recorded with Russ Garcia and His Orchestra in September 1959.  The album has been reissued several times and there have been variations to the sleeve's artwork.

Track listing

Original 1960 vinyl issue

2002 CD release

Personnel 
Recorded July 15–16, August 5, 1960, New York, New York:

Track 13 recorded September 3, 1959, United Records, Hollywood:

 Ella Fitzgerald: Vocals
 Frank DeVol: Arranger, Conductor
 Russ Garcia and His Orchestra (track 13): Arranger, Conductor

Charts

References

1960 Christmas albums
Albums produced by Norman Granz
Christmas albums by American artists
Ella Fitzgerald albums
Verve Records albums
Covers albums
Albums conducted by Frank De Vol
Albums arranged by Frank De Vol
Swing Christmas albums